Ada is a historic train station in Ada, Ohio, United States.  Built in 1887 by the Pennsylvania Railroad, it was listed on the National Register of Historic Places in 1998 as the Ada Pennsylvania Station and Railroad Park.  It is a wooden building, set on a stone foundation and topped with an asphalt roof.  The railroad park includes a Pennsylvania Railroad caboose.

Founded as a railway town, Ada grew quickly after the establishment of Ohio Northern University in the city in the 1880s.  Consequently, this station was built to accommodate increased passenger traffic; its Stick-Eastlake architecture is unusual for Pennsylvania Railroad depots, and it is larger than most stations built to serve small communities.

References

External links

Railway stations in the United States opened in 1887
Former railway stations in Ohio
Transportation in Hardin County, Ohio
National Register of Historic Places in Hardin County, Ohio
Railway stations on the National Register of Historic Places in Ohio
Former Pennsylvania Railroad stations
Queen Anne architecture in Ohio
Buildings and structures in Hardin County, Ohio
station